The 2011 Southeastern Conference football season began on Thursday, September 1, 2011 with Kentucky taking on Western Kentucky on ESPNU.  The season concluded on January 9, 2012 as the Alabama Crimson Tide shut out LSU Tigers, 21–0 in the Allstate BCS National Championship Game at the Mercedes-Benz Superdome in New Orleans to claim their 14th national championship in school history.  It was also the final season for the SEC before Texas A&M and Missouri joined the conference from the Big 12 the following season.

Preseason
Florida head coach Urban Meyer retired in early December citing his health concerns and wanting to be around his family more. Meyer then joined ESPN as an analyst for its college football coverage during the 2011 season. In his place Florida hired Texas defensive coordinator Will Muschamp as the new head coach. Muschamp elected to bring in former Notre Dame head coach Charlie Weis as his offensive coordinator.

Vanderbilt interim head coach Robbie Caldwell had a tough year in 2010 with injuries and tough schedule, going 2–10. The school decided to search for a new coach to replace former head coach Bobby Johnson, who retired unexpectedly in July 2010.  Vanderbilt hired Maryland offensive coordinator James Franklin, and this is Franklin's first head coaching job.

LSU decided to part ways with offensive coordinator Gary Crowton because of a lack of offensive production the previous seasons. In his place LSU hired former Louisville head coach Steve Kragthorpe.

Kentucky added new schemes to its defense by adding former Cincinnati head coach Rick Minter as its co-defensive coordinator alongside Steve Brown.

2011 Pre-season Coaches All-SEC

Rankings

Regular season 

All times Eastern time.

Rankings reflect that of the AP poll for that week until week eight when the BCS rankings will be used.

Week One 

Players of the week:

Week Two 

Players of the week:

Week Three 

Players of the week:

Week Four 

Players of the week:

Week Five 

Players of the week:

Week Six 

Players of the week:

Week Seven 

Players of the week:

Week Eight 

Players of the week:

Week Nine 

Players of the week:

Week Ten 

Players of the week:

Week Eleven 

Players of the week:

Week Twelve 

Players of the week:

Week Thirteen 

Players of the week:

Week Fourteen/SEC Championship

SEC vs. AQ conference and BCS-buster opponents
NOTE:. Games with a * next to the home team represent a neutral site game

Home attendance

Games played at Arkansas' secondary home stadium War Memorial Stadium, capacity: 54,120.

Attendance was 84,524 for the Georgia vs. Florida game in Jacksonville

Bowl games

Per BCS selection rules, no more than two teams from a conference may be selected, regardless of whether they are automatic qualifiers or at-large selections, unless two non-champions from the same conference are ranked No. 1 and No. 2 in the final BCS Standings. As the SEC champion  Louisiana State was the top-ranked team in the BCS poll, the Sugar Bowl was prohibited from selecting an SEC representative for the 2011–12 season.

Post-season awards and honors

All-SEC 
The following players were named by the AP All-SEC team:

All-Americans 

Running back
Trent Richardson, Alabama (AFCA-Coaches)

Defensive end
Melvin Ingram, South Carolina (AFCA-Coaches)

Tight end
Orson Charles, Georgia (AFCA-Coaches)

Linebacker
Dont'a Hightower, Alabama (AFCA-Coaches)
Jarvis Jones, Georgia (AFCA-Coaches)

Offensive guard
Barrett Jones, Alabama (AFCA-Coaches)

Secondary
Mark Barron, Alabama (AFCA-Coaches)
Morris Claiborne, LSU (AFCA-Coaches)
DeQuan Menzie, Alabama (AFCA-Coaches)

National award winners 
The following SEC players listed below have been named to the national award semifinalist and finalist lists.

References